Eloor is a suburb of Kochi and a municipality in Paravur Taluk, Ernakulam District in the Indian state of Kerala, India. It is an island of 14.21 km2 formed between two distributaries of river Periyar and is the largest industrial belt in Kerala. The neighbouring places of Eloor are Kalamassery industrial hub, Aluva, Cheranalloor and Paravur.

History
Eloor Moopans were the traditional landlords in this area. Many revolts have occurred in Kottakkunnu, Eloor regarding land reformation. Kerala's first private hospital, St. Josephs Hospital opened in Eloor in the year 1886. Manjummel Sree Krishna Swamy temple is an ancient temple

Economy
There are various companies of different kinds along the industrial belt including Fertilisers and Chemicals Travancore (FACT), Indian Rare Earths Limited, Hindustan Insecticides Limited and many others manufacturing a range of products like chemical-petrochemical products, rare-earth elements, rubber-processing chemicals, fertilizers, zinc/chromium compounds and leather products.

Demographics
 India census, Eloor had a population of 30,092. 11% of the population is under 6 years of age. Males constitute 50% of the population and females 50%. Eloor has an average literacy rate of 84%, somewhat higher than the national average of 59.5%: male literacy is 86%, and female literacy is 81%.

Education
Educational institutions in the area include      .S.H.J.U.P.School Eloor North
 FACT Public School, Eloor.
 St. Ann's Higher Secondary School Eloor
 MES Udyogmandal School
 Guardian Angels Public School, Manjummel
 MES Eastern UP School
 Govt. L.P. School, Eloor South,
 Govt. U.P School, Kuttikattukara
 Kasthurba English Medium School, Manjummel
 Crescent Kinter Garden, Eloor North
 Pathalam Govt. Higher Secondary School
 Central Institute Of Plastic Engineering And Technology www.cipet.gov.in/centres/cipet-kochi/contact-us.php

Hospitals
 ESI Hospital, Pathalam
 St. Joseph's Hospital, Manjummel
 Primary Health Center Eloor Depot 
 Shankar Pharmacy

Religious
 Eloor east muhyadheen juma masjid thekkepuram (puthalam masjid)
 Pattupurakkal Devi Temple
 Balasubramanya Temple, Eloor Depot
 Sree Subramanya Temple, Sree Kumara Vilasam Sabha, SN Nagar, Manjummel
 SNDP Branch, 1071, SN Nagar, Manjummel.
 SN Samoohya Seva Sangam, SN Nagar, Manjummel
 Sree Krishna Swami Temple, Manjummel
 Naranath Sree Krishna Swami Temple
 Kuttakav Bhagavathy Temple
 Our Lady of Immaculate Conception Church, Manjummel
 Elanjickal Bhagavathy Kshetram
 Elanjickal Mahadeva Kshetram
 Elanjickal Nagaraja Kshetram
 FACT Central Juma Masjid, Fact Jn.
 Eloor Juma Masjid
 Najathul Islam Masjid, Eloor North
 Vayalvaramkavu Bhagavathy Temple Eloor Methanam
 St. Antony's Church, Eloor Ferry road 
 St. Joseph's Church, Eloor Ferry
 Christ the king Church, Eloor Depot
 St Thomas Church, Kuttikkatukara
 St. Jude's Church, Pathalam
 St. Ann's Church, Eloor
 Noorul Huda Masjid Eloor Deopot
 Sree Bhuvaneshwari Temple, Manjummel, Eloor 
 Sree Krishna Vilasam N.S.S Karayogam, Manjummel
 ELOOR KIZHAKKUMBHAGAM DEVI KSHETHRAM (MARANGATTU)
 SNDP ELOOR EAST 1304.

Notable people

 Beena Antony
 Rafi Mecartin, Film director
 Nadirshah
 Pattanam Rasheed

Sports

FACT Stadium is the cradle of Cochin football lovers. Many other athletes also contributed by this village.

See also
 Paravur Taluk
 Ernakulam District

References

Cities and towns in Ernakulam district
Suburbs of Kochi